Pubis may refer to:

 Pubis (bone)
 Mons pubis, a padding of fat that protects the pubis bone